This article contains a list of Perth railway station platform arrangements.

Prior to opening of Thornlie spur line 
The following arrangements were in place from the opening of the Joondalup Line on 21 March 1993 until 8 August 2005, when weekday services commenced on the Thornlie Line:
Platform 1:  (Whitfords Shuttle) to Whitfords, weekdays only
Platform 2:  to Clarkson
Platform 3:  to Bunbury, operated by Transwa
Platform 4: set down only
Platform 5: set down only
Platform 6:  to Armadale
Platform 7:  to Fremantle
Platform 8: Not in regular use,  to Fremantle on special events
Platform 9:  to Midland

Opening of Thornlie spur line 
The following arrangements were in place from 8 August 2005 until 13 October 2007, when the new underground platforms opened:

Opening of Perth Underground and Mandurah railway line 
From 13 October 2007, platforms were re-numbered so that there were still 9 platforms with the 2 new platforms at Perth Underground. Old Platform 1 is no longer in use, likewise for old Platform 5. Old Platform 2 became Platform .

The following arrangements were in place from 14 October 2007 until 4 December 2010, when stage 1 of the Perth City Link project commenced:

Perth City Link: Stage 1 
The following arrangements were in place from 5 December 2010 until 30 July 2011 during the stage 1 of the Perth City Link project:

Perth City Link: Stage 2 
The following arrangements were in place from 31 July 2011 until 20 August 2012 during stage 2 of the Perth City Link project:

Perth City Link: Stage 3 
The following arrangements were in place from 20 August 2012 until 20 May 2013 during stage 3 of the Perth City Link project:

Perth City Link: Stage 4 
The following arrangements have been in place since 20 May 2013 and will be until 18 July 2013 during stage 4 of the Perth City Link project and until the new Fremantle railway line tunnel is completed:

Completion of Fremantle railway line tunnel 
The following are arrangements from 18 July 2013 after the completion of the new Fremantle railway line tunnel:

Platform 4 upgrade 
From 13 October 2013 until 15 December 2013, Platform 4 was not in use while undergoing upgrade. Thus, Thornlie railway line operated from Platform 6 on the said dates.

Midland Line permanent platform change 
From 16 December 2013 onwards, Midland railway line operates from Platform 9 permanently. Moreover, Thornlie railway line returns operation in Platform 4 following the platform upgrade.

Reversal of Midland Line permanent platform change 
From 25 August 2014 the Midland Line reverted to Platform 8.

Midland Line permanent platform change 
From 16 December 2013 onwards, Midland railway line operates from Platform 9 permanently. Moreover, Thornlie railway line returns operation in Platform 4 following the platform upgrade.

Reversal of Midland Line permanent platform change 
From 25 August 2014 the Midland Line reverted to Platform 8.

Current arrangement

References

Railway station platform arrangements, old
History of rail transport in Western Australia